Thepla is a soft Indian flatbread typical of Gujarati cuisine

It is typically enjoyed as a breakfast, or can be eaten for snacks. It can also be served as a side dish with a meal, or as a snack in the late afternoon. Thepla can be made with wheat flour, besan (gram flour), methi (fenugreek leaves) and other spices. Thepla can be enjoyed together with dahi (yogurt), red garlic chutney and chhundo (sweet mango pickle).

Varieties 
The various types of theplas are cooked by varying the ingredients. Common variants include methi, mooli and dudhi. Theplas can also be made with mashed potatoes, mixed vegetables, or garlic. The most popular version of this traditional dish is methi thepla.

Difference in chapati and thepla 
Chapati dough is made with whole white flour (finer), oil/ghee seasoned with salt by binding flour mostly with water.  Chapatis are an everyday food, cooked on a griddle usually without an oil or ghee and often puffed up by cooking on open flame after taking it off the flame, some ghee is spread on the top. Thepla is often multigrain, usually made with whole wheat flour with the addition of chickpea and millet flour. When made for travel, the flour for theplas is bound into a stiff dough using milk instead of water, and with extra ghee/oil. This is done in order to increase their shelf life.

See also 
 Gujarati cuisine
 Dhebra

References

Indian cuisine
Gujarati cuisine